The tyrT operon is a series of genes encoding the tRNA for tyrosine in Escherichia coli. It is activated in response to amino acid starvation.

Components
The tyrT operon consists of an upstream activation sequence, the gene for the tyrosine tRNA called tRNA1Tyr, and an RNA called rtT RNA which has an unknown function.

Regulation
Transcription of the tyrT operon is activated by the stringent response. Binding of the FIS protein to the operon's upstream activation sequence tightly bends the DNA, promoting transcription.

References

Escherichia coli genes
Operons